Khela Fana Thwala (born 11 March 1970) is a South African boxer. He competed in the men's light flyweight event at the 1992 Summer Olympics.

References

1970 births
Living people
South African male boxers
Olympic boxers of South Africa
Boxers at the 1992 Summer Olympics
Place of birth missing (living people)
Light-flyweight boxers